Utikoomak Lake 155A is an Indian reserve of the Whitefish Lake First Nation in Alberta, located within Northern Sunrise County. In the 2016 Canadian Census, it recorded a population of 127 living in 29 of its 34 total private dwellings.

References

Indian reserves in Alberta
Whitefish Lake First Nation